"Welcome to the Rodeo" is a song by American rapper Lil Skies from his mixtape Life of a Dark Rose. It was produced by Taz Taylor.

Composition
Jordan Sargent of Spin described the song as gathering "intoxicating, careening momentum as Skies unravels his origin story", with Skies rapping in a confident manner over a "darting, subterranean beat".

Music video
A music video for the song was released on March 29, 2018. Directed by Cole Bennett, it pays homage to the music video of "A Milli" by Lil Wayne. It follows Lil Skies interacting with fans while accompanied by a security guard. He is taken photos, and makes his way to a convertible as a crowd of fans dances behind him, and drives off.

Charts

Certifications

References

2018 singles
2018 songs
Atlantic Records singles
Lil Skies songs
Music videos directed by Cole Bennett
Song recordings produced by Taz Taylor (record producer)
Songs written by Taz Taylor (record producer)
Songs written by Lil Skies